Hit Parade of 1943 also known as Change of Heart is a 1943 American musical film made by Republic Pictures. It was directed by Albert S. Rogell and produced by Albert J. Cohen from a screenplay by Frank Gill Jr. and Frances Hyland.

The film stars John Carroll, Susan Hayward (singing dubbed by Jeanne Darrell), Gail Patrick (singing dubbed by Ruth Fox), Eve Arden, Melville Cooper, Walter Catlett, Mary Treen, and Dorothy Dandridge. It also features several orchestras including the Count Basie Orchestra, Freddy Martin and his orchestra, Ray McKinley and his orchestra, and the Golden Gate Quartet.

Cast
 John Carroll as Rick Farrell
 Susan Hayward as Jill Wright
 Gail Patrick as 	Toni Jarrett
 Eve Arden as 	Belinda Wright
 Melville Cooper as 	Bradley Cole
 Walter Catlett as J. MacClellan Davis
 Mary Treen as Janie
 Tom Kennedy as Westinghouse
 Astrid Allwyn as Joyce Germaine
 Tim Ryan as 	Brownie May
 Dorothy Dandridge as Count Basie Band Singer
 Addison Richards as Mr. Demeling, Producer
 Gino Corrado as 	Kitchen Chef 
 Olaf Hytten as 	Waiter

References

Bibliography
 Hurst, Richard M. Republic Studios: Beyond Poverty Row and the Majors. Scarecrow Press, 2007.

External links

 
 
 
 

1943 films
1940s English-language films
Films scored by Walter Scharf
Republic Pictures films
Films directed by Albert S. Rogell
1943 musical films
American musical films
American black-and-white films
1940s American films